Star Island is a 2010 novel by Carl Hiaasen, released on Tuesday, July 27, 2010.

The novel takes its name from Star Island in Miami Beach, Florida, where part of the story takes place.

Plot summary
Ann DeLusia, the "stunt double" for habitually intoxicated and drug-addicted pop star "Cherry Pye", is mistakenly kidnapped by an obsessed paparazzo.  Now, the star's entourage must find a way to rescue Ann, and do it without revealing her identity to the star herself, or the world at large.

The novel also features the re-appearance of Hiaasen's recurring character, ex-Florida governor Clinton "Skink" Tyree.

Detailed Plot Summary
Paparazzo "Bang" Abbott is lying in wait outside a posh South Beach hotel, on a tip that pop star Cherry Pye has overdosed again. However, when the paramedics bring a woman down to the ambulance, he sees that she is a body double. Meanwhile, the real Cherry is being driven to the nearest hospital in a private limousine by her entourage. The body double is Ann DeLusia, an actress hired by Cherry's family to make brief public appearances when Cherry is too inebriated to do so. Cherry's mother/manager, Janet Bunterman, tells Ann to take a few days off, while Cherry is packed off, yet again, to drug rehab. Infuriated at having been fooled by a body double, Bang becomes even more obsessed with getting photos of Cherry under sordid circumstances.

In Los Angeles, Cherry jumps over the wall of the rehab center and hitches a ride to the airport from a nearby motorist, who happens to be Bang staking out the clinic. Pleased by his transparent flattery, Cherry takes him along when she charters a private jet to Florida. Aboard the plane, Bang is astonished when she decides to have an onboard quickie with him. His astonishment turns to outrage when she drives away in a limousine and strands him at the airport, taking his camera bag and BlackBerry with her. Meanwhile, Ann spends her few days off touring the Florida Keys, but while driving through Key Largo, she swerves to avoid a man scooping a roadkill off the highway and drives off a bridge. When she wakes up, the man, "Skink" has rescued her.  

With apologies, Skink brings Ann along on a brief mission to kidnap and intimidate real estate developer Jackie Sebago. Afterwards, Skink has a friend give her a ride to the nearest hospital, and gives her the number for his seldom-used cell phone, to call in case she ever needs help. Over Janet's protests, Cherry's record promoter, Maury Lykes, assigns a man nicknamed "Chemo" to replace her recently fired bodyguard. As revenge for her theft of his cameras and smartphone, Bang kidnaps Cherry outside her hotel at gunpoint, only to realize that the woman he has snatched is Ann. He demands, in exchange for Ann's safe return, that Cherry be made available to him for a private photo shoot. Ann is furious to hear that the Buntermans have not even reported her missing. She hurriedly uses her cell phone to contact Skink.

When the Buntermans refuse to agree to Bang's demand, he dresses Ann up in costume and shoots pictures of her with a discarded syringe, making it look as if "Cherry" is a drug addict. His threat to release the pictures is taken much more seriously than his threat against Ann's life. In fact, since Cherry's career is dangerously close to ending already, her father Ned suggests using the kidnapping as a publicity stunt to boost interest in her upcoming concert tour and comeback album. The photo shoot and hostage exchange takes place on Star Island, in the rented home of Cherry's actor boyfriend. Cherry is duped into thinking that she is posing for the cover of Vanity Fair, while Ann confronts her employers over their indifference to her safety. At that moment, Skink tracks her down, and Ann prefers to leave with him rather than the Buntermans.

After the photo shoot, Chemo confiscates the digital memory cards from Bang's cameras. Maury had ordered him to kill Bang, but Bang convinces him that once Cherry is dead, they can make a fortune publishing them. Chemo decides to let Bang live and hangs onto the photos. Meanwhile, the Buntermans meet with Ann and Skink and offer her $50,000 in hush money. Ann declines, settling instead for plane fare back to California and the price of a Zegna suit she bought for Skink. She also informs them that she's quitting her role as Cherry's double, and warns them never to contact her again. Maury flirts with the idea of paying Chemo to kill her, but Chemo refuses and warns Maury not to send anyone else after her (after less than a week spent with Cherry and her parents, Chemo is now firmly on Ann's side).

The Buntermans admit to Cherry that the photo shoot was a ruse, but she is pleased to hear that she will be the star of a media blitz surrounding her fake kidnapping. Cherry is upset to be told that, to sell the story, she will need to be secluded for a few days, ostensibly "recovering" from her ordeal. With Skink's assistance, Ann makes a conspicuous appearance at a nightclub using Cherry's name. A short time later, Cherry escapes from her parents' guard at the hotel and goes to the club with her boyfriend. There, Ann tells Cherry the truth about her role as Cherry's "stunt double". Cherry launches herself at Ann in an inebriated rage before Chemo carries her out. As he is doing so, Cherry vomits, inadvertently ruining the memory cards in his pocket containing the photos. Cherry's "meltdown" is captured by the paparazzi outside the club, instantly sabotaging her entourage's plan to sell the kidnapping story. Ann and Skink slip away in the chaos.

Bang, however, does not get a photo of Cherry. Like the other paparazzi, he is lying in wait outside the club, but he is shot through the buttocks by a thug hired by one of his disgruntled tipsters. The tipster sent the information to Bang's BlackBerry while Cherry had possession of it, and Bang was unaware that the man was expecting his usual fee. In a touch of poetic justice, Bang finds himself on the receiving end of his profession's notorious indifference to pain and suffering: as he lies in agony on the sidewalk, none of his fellow "shooters" are inclined to give him aid, but just keep snapping pictures of him as he is lifted into an ambulance.

Epilogue
(Like many of Hiaasen's novels, the book ends with an epilogue summarizing the outcome of the various plot lines and the fate of the characters in bulletin form.)
 Cherry's concert tour is canceled, and her comeback album is a flop, after her highly public "meltdown" and the embarrassing revelation about her need for a stunt double.  Cherry's career continues, though on a much humbler level than before.  She is last reported as the star of her own reality series on TLC Network chronicling her gradual return to sobriety.
 Cherry's parents (whose relationship was sustained only by their shared interest in Cherry's career) separate after her music career collapses.  Her publicists continue to be much in demand, while Maury is forced to flee the U.S. and is eventually murdered by the father of one of his underage "protegées".
 Chemo quits security work and returns to his former career as a mortgage loan broker.
 Bang only partially recovers from his bullet-wounding.  No longer able to chase celebrities, he operates a small portrait studio in Culver City, California.
 Ann establishes herself as a serious actress in Hollywood through a series of critically successful films.  Although her former role as Cherry's double becomes public knowledge, Ann steadfastly refuses to capitalize on her brief notoriety, including turning down several lucrative book deals, and becomes famous on her own terms.
 Ann has never heard from Skink again, but hears from their mutual friend Jim Tile that the former governor of Florida is "in a good place".

Characters

Main Characters
Ann DeLusia: A struggling actress normally based in Los Angeles, Ann was hired by Cherry Pye's family largely because of their physical resemblance.  Cherry frequently needs someone to impersonate her in public to cover up her episodes of excess (though Cherry herself is completely unaware of this).  Other than their looks, Ann is Cherry's polar opposite in every way: sober, intelligent, and dependable.
Claude "Bang" Abbott: Formerly a Pulitzer Prize-winning staff photographer for the St. Petersburg Times, Claude quit the paper under ignominious circumstances and now lives the frenzied, itinerant (but extremely lucrative) life of a paparazzo.  Originally obsessed with snapping a photo of Cherry under sordid circumstances, he becomes obsessed in a different way when she seduces him in a drunken haze aboard a private jet.

The star and her entourage
Cherry Pye: Born Cheryl Gail Bunterman, Cherry won early fame at age 14 with a one-line appearance in a Nickelodeon after-school TV special, which her aggressive parents and equally aggressive record promoter inflated into a career as a pop star (though her songs are entirely ghost-written and lip-synched, due to Cherry's nonexistent singing voice and general lack of musicality).  Now aged 22, she is uncontrollably addicted to alcohol, drugs, and sexual promiscuity.
Janet Bunterman: Cheryl/Cherry's mother/manager.  Janet is fanatically devoted to promoting her daughter's stardom, and insists on maintaining "positive energy" at all times - which manifests itself as an immovable state of denial about Cherry's many addictions (for instance, blaming her frequent drug overdoses on attacks of gastritis).
Ned Bunterman: Cheryl/Cherry's father/accountant.  His devotion to his daughter's career (and the money it brings into the family coffers) is equal to his wife's, though he does not share her blindness to their daughter's fragile state.  However, he is of minimal help since his wife usually takes the lead in dealing with their daughter.
Maury Lykes: Cherry's record promoter (he became interested in her after seeing her on Nickelodeon, which he regularly watches, being a closet pedophile).  Unlike the Buntermans, he has no illusions about Cherry's lack of talent and self-destructive tendencies, but has a heavy stake in her upcoming comeback album and concert tour.
Lucy and Lila Lark: Cherry's publicists.  Born fraternal twins, they were so alike in temperament and thought that they later achieved, through plastic surgery, a shared desire to become identical twins.  They are renowned in the entertainment industry for their skill at spin doctoring and other forms of "damage control", which allows them to limit their clientele to only the most famous, or most recklessly self-destructive, celebrities.

Recurring Characters
Blondell Wayne Tatum, a.k.a. Chemo: a disfigured bodyguard, first introduced in Hiaasen's novel, Skin Tight.
Clinton "Skink" Tyree: former governor of Florida, now wild bushman and environmental vigilante.
Jim Tile: A retired State Trooper from the Florida Highway Patrol, Skink's former bodyguard and best friend.

Other Characters
Tanner Dane Keefe: a young actor of handsome looks and mediocre talent, riding the fame of being attached to Quentin Tarantino's latest upcoming slasher/parody film (in which he plays a necrophiliac surfer).  He becomes Cherry's latest love interest, though it takes all of ten days before she starts to lose interest in him.
Jackie Sebago: a real-estate developer planning to build an upscale condominium complex in Key Largo, an enterprise which is already teetering on the brink of failure thanks to the United States housing bubble and his own fiscal irresponsibility, when Skink appears to violently dissuade him from continuing with it.
William Shea: one of Jackie's aggrieved investors, who demands the return of his money with increasing menace.
Detective Rob Reilly: detective with the Monroe County Sheriff's Office; he stumbles onto Skink's trail after his assault on Jackie Sebago, but ends up with little to no evidence of a crime.
D.T. Maltby: Clinton Tyree's former lieutenant governor, and one of his principal betrayers.  Now a well-paid lobbyist living in Key Largo.
Ruben "Whaddup" Coyle: a mediocre point guard for the Miami Heat basketball team, whose career is on the skids due to recurring tendencies to lease luxury Jaguar convertibles and then wreck said vehicles under the influence of alcohol and drugs.
Freemont Spores: a retired newsprint mechanic who now operates a bank of contraband police scanners and feeds juicy tips to tabloid reporters, photographers, and the Miami underworld.
Teddy Loo: one of Abbott's competing "shooters" (paparazzi).

Allusions/references to actual history, geography and current science
Janet complains that Ann is "wasting away in Tequilaville", mangling the lyrics of Jimmy Buffett's song "Margaritaville."
The novel drops the names of several real-life celebrities, either as quarry of Bang Abbott, or rivals of Cherry.  Some memorable references include:
Abbott remembers the media "frenzy" that followed Michael Jackson's death, and his obsession with stalking Cherry is based not so much on her talent or even the stature of her fame, but rather his conviction that she is most likely to "beat the others to the grave", and that her death will generate another bonanza of publicity and demand for photos of her.
Abbott feels "scarred" at not being able to be "on the scene" in Los Angeles at the time of Jackson's death, because he was in Nassau, on a false tip that Mitt Romney had checked into the Atlantis Paradise Island resort with a pair of prostitutes.
While criticizing the paparazzi in front of Abbott, Cherry makes an offhand reference to their role in the accidental death of Princess Diana.
One of Cherry's previous attempts to rejuvenate her failing career involved circulating a sex tape on the Internet, which Abbott bought and was disappointed to find was even duller than Paris Hilton's;
Cherry proposes that she adopt a baby as a publicity stunt; attempting to discourage the notion, Janet argues that celebrity adoptions have already been over-hyped, thanks to "Angelina and Madge" (likely a reference to Angelina Jolie and Madonna);
When asked to name the worst thing he's ever done in pursuit of a photo, Abbott recalls bribing a florist's delivery boy to snap shots of a comatose Farrah Fawcett on her deathbed;
Abbott recounts that the worst humiliation he ever suffered as a paparazzo was when Charlie Sheen threw him to the ground and urinated in his ear.
When duping Cherry into thinking she is posing for Vanity Fair, her entourage recalls the hysterical tantrum Cherry threw when Lindsay Lohan appeared on the cover of that magazine.
Behind her back, Cherry's entourage frequently compare her to British pop singer Amy Winehouse, for her reckless and recurring use of drugs and alcohol.  Cherry's father points to Winehouse as an ominous illustration of what might happen to Cherry's career if she is not kept under control, noting that Winehouse (unlike Cherry) has genuine talent, but that has not stopped drug and alcohol abuse from wrecking her career.
Kurt, Chemo's one-day replacement as Cherry's bodyguard, refuses her demand that he shave his head, saying that none of his past female clients - including Lady Gaga, Anne Hathaway and Tara Reid - made him do so.  He admits that Reid tried, as she had a "thing" for Ving Rhames.  Kurt adds that he likes Rhames, but has no desire to emulate his hairstyle.  Rhames played one of the main characters in the film adaptation of Hiaasen's novel Strip Tease.

2010 American novels
Novels by Carl Hiaasen
Novels set in Florida
Alfred A. Knopf books
Miami Beach, Florida